is a passenger railway station located in the city of Kasama, Ibaraki Prefecture, Japan operated by the East Japan Railway Company (JR East).

Lines
Kasama Station is served by the Mito Line, and is located 43.3 km from the official starting point of the line at Oyama Station.

Station layout
The station consists of one side platform and one island platform, connected to the station building by a footbridge. The station is staffed.

Platforms

History
Kasama Station was opened on 16 January 1889. The station was absorbed into the JR East network upon the privatization of the Japanese National Railways (JNR) on 1 April 1987.

Passenger statistics
In fiscal 2019, the station was used by an average of 1292 passengers daily (boarding passengers only).

Surrounding area
 
former Kasama City Hall
Kasama Post Office
Kasama Inari Shrine

See also
 List of railway stations in Japan

References

External links

  Station information JR East Station Information 

Railway stations in Ibaraki Prefecture
Mito Line
Railway stations in Japan opened in 1889
Kasama, Ibaraki